Nathania may refer to:

Netanya, city in Israel
Nathania Stanford, actor in The Lost World (1992 film)